The List of post offices in the British Mandate of Palestine refers to post offices operated in Palestine under allied British military control of the Occupied Enemy Territory Administration and, after 1920, the civil administration of the British Mandate of Palestine. During the Mandate, postal services were provided by British authorities.

About 160 post offices, branch offices, rural agencies, travelling post offices, and town agencies operated, some only for a few months, others for the entire length of the period. Upon the advance of allied forces in 1917 and 1918 initially Field Post Offices and Army Post Offices served the local civilian population. Some of the latter offices were converted to Stationary Army Post Offices and became civilian post offices upon establishment of the civilian administration. In 1919 fifteen offices existed, rising to about 100 by 1939, and about 150 by the end of the Mandate in May 1948.

With most of the Jerusalem General Post Office archives destroyed, research depends heavily on philatelists recording distinct postmarks and dates of their use.

The postal service operated by the Mandatory authorities was reputed to be the best in the Middle East. Letters were delivered daily in Jerusalem. Palestine joined the Universal Postal Union in October 1923. The post was transported by boat, train, cars and horses, and after 1927, also by air. During the volatility of 1947 and 1948, British postal services deteriorated and were replaced by ad hoc interim services prior to the partition and the establishment of the State of Israel.

Mandate post offices

See also
 Postal rates in the British Mandate of Palestine
 Postage stamps and postal history of Palestine
 Postage stamps and postal history of Israel

References
Header Notes

Notes

Sources
 Dorfman, David (1985). Palestine Mandate postmarks. Sarasota, Fla.: Tower Of David.
 Goldstein, Carlos and Emil S. Dickstein (1983). Haifa and Jaffa postmarks of the Palestine Mandate. Beachwood, Oh.: Society of Israel Philatelists.
 Firebrace, John A. (1991). British Empire campaigns and occupations in the Near East, 1914–1924: a postal history. London & Bournemouth: Christie's Robson Lowe. .
 Groten, Arthur H. (1988). The postmarks of Mandate Tel Aviv. Beachwood, Oh.: Society of Israel Philatelists.
 Proud, Edward B. (2006). The postal history of Palestine and Transjordan. Heathfield. . First edition (1985): The postal history of British Palestine 1918-1948.
 Sacher, Michael M. (1995). The postal markings of Mandate Palestine: 1917-1948. London: Royal Philatelic Society. .

Lists of organizations
Mandatory Palestine-related lists